Péter Kovács (born 28 September 1959) is a retired Hungarian gymnast. He competed at the 1980 Summer Olympics in all artistic gymnastics events and won a bronze medal with the Hungarian team. Individually his best achievement was fifth place in the floor exercise. An element on horizontal bar is named after Kovács.

References

1959 births
Living people
Hungarian male artistic gymnasts
Gymnasts at the 1980 Summer Olympics
Olympic gymnasts of Hungary
Olympic bronze medalists for Hungary
Olympic medalists in gymnastics
Medalists at the 1980 Summer Olympics
Originators of elements in artistic gymnastics
People from Heves
Sportspeople from Heves County